Aydar Azatovich Zakarin (born 19 April 1994 in Lipetsk) is a Russian former professional cyclist, who rode professionally between 2013 and 2017 for the , ,  and  teams. His brother Ilnur Zakarin has also competed professionally as a cyclist.

References

External links

1994 births
Living people
Russian male cyclists
Sportspeople from Lipetsk